PT Indosiar Visual Mandiri, commonly known as Indosiar, is an Indonesian over-the-air television network. It broadcasts nationwide on UHF and can be received throughout the Indonesian archipelago on analog PAL television sets, established on 19 July 1991, later began test broadcast on 18 December 1994, and officially launched on 11 January 1995. It is owned by Elang Mahkota Teknologi since 2011; it eventually operated under its subsidiary, Surya Citra Media since 1 May 2013, when the network's original owner, Indosiar Karya Media, absorbed into the latter company.

Programming 
The network has a strong focus on cultural programming, such as a wayang performance (which no longer aired) and dangdut talent shows. It has recently featured occasional sport programmes and television series.

Indosiar airs some Korean, Japanese, and Taiwanese dramas, including Goblin, Hwang Ji Ni (or Hwag Jin Yi), Jewel in the Palace (Dae Jang Geum), Princess Hours (Goong), Prince Hours (Goong S), Full House, Boys Before Flowers, My Fair Lady, No Limits, Style, Brilliant Legacy, Great Queen Seon Deok, 18 vs 29, all from Korea; One Litre of Tears (or One litre no Namida), Ultraman Mebius, Detective Conan, and Hanazakari no Kimitachi e from Japan; and Romance in the White House and Starlit from Taiwan.

Indosiar also airs Indonesian animated cartoons, including Keluarga Somat (Somat's Family), broadcast since June 2013 (until the sister network Mentari TV take over the broadcasting rights in 2021).

Other popular Indosiar programs include musical drama series like Melangkah Di Atas Awan; singing competitions such as Akademi Fantasi Indosiar, the most popular singing talent search in Indonesia; Supersoulmate Show, Mamamia, and Stardut.

The network had aimed for more popularity through reality shows, such as Take Me Out Indonesia, a dating show started in 2009. In 2014, Indosiar began broadcasting the new variety shows Dangdut Academy, Comedy Academy, D'T3rong Show, Goyang-goyang Senggol, Liga Dangdut Indonesia, Bintang Pantura, and Pop Academy.

In 2013, Indosiar began broadcasting religious-themed television series from Mega Kreasi Films, and dramas from Amanah Surga Productions, broadcast alongside SCTV. Nowadays, religious-themed series become the network's most featured daytime programming, while dangdut talent shows are airing for evening programme. These programs are broadcasting daily.

As of 2018, Indosiar removed all Korean dramas, Indonesian animated cartoons and Japanese anime in favor of religious-themed Indonesian dramas, such as Kisah Nyata (lit:True Story), Azab (lit: Punishment), Pintu Berkah (lit. Door of Blessing), and Suara Hati Istri (lit. The Wife's Consciense).

 Sports programming 

Indosiar currently broadcast the American NBA Finals from 2017 to 2020, Indonesian Liga 1 from 2018 to 2023, Indonesian President's Cup from 2015, and Southeast Asian Games for 2013, 2015, and 2017 editions along with Liga 2.

Previously, Indosiar also aired NASCAR Cup Series in 2003, FA Premier League from 1998 to 2000 again in 2013-2016 (with SCTV), Serie A from 2005 until 2007 and in 2011, plus an Inter Milan-A. C. Milan match in 2014, as well as Bundesliga in 2012 and 2013. Indosiar also had rugby programming in Orange Top 14 and Kalbe Super Rugby.

The channel also aired syndicated World Championship Wrestling programming from the station's inception until the promotion was purchased by World Wrestling Federation as well as local boxing matches under the title of Gelar Tinju Professional (Pro Boxing Title''). Combat sports programming returned to Indosiar in 2013-14 when it aired the ONE FC; the programming would be later moved to the sister channel SCTV.

Presenters

Current
 Arni Gusmiarni (as news executive producer)
 Asran Aga Shady (former Trans TV anchor)
 Danny Maulana (former Kompas TV anchor)
 Jemmy Darusman (former Lativi anchor)
 Nurul Cinta
 Pratiwi Kusuma (former iNews and NET. anchor)
 Ryan Wiedaryanto (former Trans TV anchor)
 Sheila Baladraf (former GTV and MNC News anchor)
 Sheila Purnama (former NET. anchor)
 Utrich Farzah (former Trans TV and Kompas TV anchor)
 Wandha Dwi Utari
 Zulfikar Naghi (former Trans TV anchor)

Former
 Achmad Faizal
 Adam Firmansyah (now at Motion Radio)
 Agung Hardiansyah (now at BTV)
 Agung Izzulhaq (now at tvOne)
 Alfina Damayanti
 Budi Sampurno
 Budi Utami
 Bunga Harum Dani (now at TVRI)
 Des Hanafi
 Devita Ayu Maharani 
 Diaz Kaslina
 Dhiya Ulhaq (now at Radio Sonora)
 Erwin Dwinanto (once hosted Liga Indonesia 1999/2000, 2001 and 2004)
 Faiz Nurfaizi
 Farma Dinata (now at ANTV)
 Fella Sumendap
 Fristian Griec (now at BTV)
 Haryz Wijaya
 Jenny Tan
 Muhammad Fauzan
 Muhammad Fadhilah
 Nike Kusmarini
 Ninok Hariyani
 Rana Rayendra
 Rania Shamlan
 Rara Munzir
 Resa Aruan
 Reza Marta Fawzy
 Suhartono
 Tina Talisa
 Tirza Bonyadone
 Undang Suhendar (already hosted "Horison", "Gelar Tinju Profesional" and "Gelar Tinju Dunia")
 Vitri Wahyuni (vacant)
 Ziza Hamzah (now at Kompas TV)
 Zuwina Zabir

Popularity 
Its claimed audience share for September 2008 was 16.2% of viewers. By December 2009 this share had shrunk to 11.6%.

Logos 

Indosiar has used several logos throughout its history. The first logo debuted in 1994 and was reused in 2012. Then, the logo was updated and debuted on 1 December 2014 for DOGs and was officially used as corporate logo on 11 January 2015.

Notable main directors 
 Eko Supardjo Rustam (1992-1994)
 Anky Handoko (1994-2011)
 Lie Halim (2011-2012)
 Emmanuel Loe Soei Kim (2012-2014)
 Drs. Imam Sudjarwo, MP (2014–present)

See also 
List of television stations in Indonesia
TVB
Moji
SCTV
Elshinta TV
Ajwa TV
Mentari TV

References

External links 
 Official site 

 
Television channels and stations established in 1995
Mass media in Jakarta
Television networks in Indonesia
Elang Mahkota Teknologi